GrowNYC is an environmental organization founded in 1970 and based in New York City, originally named the Council on the Environment of New York City (CENYC). GrowNYC is dedicated to the improvement New York City's quality of life through environmental programs, including Farmers' markets, community recycling, gardening, and environmental education.

Food Access Programs

Fresh Food Boxes 
GrowNYC offers fresh food boxes that New Yorkers can pick up to support local farmers and city food access programs.  In order to promote access for all, patrons can pay for food boxes using SNAP/EBT benefits, and are generally offered at $1/pound for seasonal produce.

Green Markets and Farmstands 
Throughout the city, GrowNYC has food markets that operate on different days, such as the market in Union Square on Thursday afternoons. These stands allow local farmers and food makers to sell their goods.  New Yorkers can use SNAP/EBT benefits at these markets, and can find markets near them using GrowNYC's locator tool.

Education 
GrowNYC's education outreach program helps students learn about recycling, food access, and conservation.  Students may take field trips to Green Markets, establish and maintain a school garden, or become recycling champions through GrowNYC.  Interested students can volunteer to help other students learn about these initiatives.

References 

Environmental issues in New York City
Environmental justice in New York City
Environmental organizations based in New York City
Organizations with year of establishment missing
Waste management infrastructure of New York City
Recycling in New York City
Community gardening in New York City
Non-profit organizations based in New York City